2022 Burkina Faso coup d'état may refer to:

 January 2022 Burkina Faso coup d'état
 September 2022 Burkina Faso coup d'état